Knight of the St. Sava Order of Diplomatic Pacifism is a form of Knighthood awarded by the Foreign Ministry of Republic of Serbia, for humanitarian work.

Women who receive the award may use the honorific prefix Dame, and men Sir.

Recipients
 Roksanda Ilinčić, 29 May 2018
 Ljiljana Marković, 29 May 2018
 Marina Arsenijevic, 29 May 2018
 Arno Gujon, 29 May 2018
 Mila Mulroney, 29 May 2018
 Rebecca MacDonald, 29 May 2018
 Gideon Graf, 29 May 2018
 Jelena Buhac Radojčić, 29 May 2018
 Gojko Rončević -Mraović, 29 May 2018
 Smilja Tišma, 29 May 2018
 Ivana Lučić, 29 May 2018
 Slobodanka Grković, 29 May 2018
 Rosie Stephenson-Goodknight, 29 May 2018
 Darko Tanasković, 29 May 2018

See also 
 Order of St. Sava

References 

Orders of chivalry of Serbia